Matthew Thomas Connors (23 October 1894 – 16 December 1948) was an Australian rules footballer who played with Melbourne and Richmond in the Victorian Football League (VFL). He later returned to original team, Shepparton, and won a premiership with them in 1927.

Notes

External links 

 

1894 births
1948 deaths
Australian rules footballers from Victoria (Australia)
Melbourne Football Club players
Richmond Football Club players
Shepparton Football Club players